Tusheti Protected Landscape is located in the Tusheti Mountainous region in the north-eastern part of Georgia. Visitors center is located in village lower Alvani, Akhmeta Municipality.
It is one of the eight new Protected Areas approved by Parliament of Georgia on 22 April 2003.

The Tusheti Protected Areas includes Tusheti Protected Landscape, Tusheti National Park and Tusheti Strict Nature Reserve with total protected area about 113,660.2 ha.

See also 
 List of protected areas of Georgia
 Tusheti National Park
 Tusheti Strict Nature Reserve

References 

National parks of Georgia (country)
Protected areas established in 2003
Geography of Kakheti
Tourist attractions in Kakheti